SAAM may refer to:
Smithsonian American Art Museum
Seattle Asian Art Museum
Software Architecture Analysis Method
Sexual Assault Awareness Month
Statin-associated autoimmune myopathy